The 1908–09 Navy Midshipmen men's basketball team represented the United States Naval Academy in intercollegiate basketball during the 1908–09 season. The head coach was Billy Lush, coaching his first season with the Midshipmen.

Schedule

|-

References

Navy Midshipmen men's basketball seasons
Navy
Navy
Navy